MV Shapinsay is a Ro-Ro vehicle ferry operated by Orkney Ferries.

History
MV Shapinsay was built by Yorkshire Drydock in Kingston upon Hull in 1989. She was refurbished and lengthened by 6m in 2011 at an estimated cost of £1.5 million.

Service
MV Shapinsay is normally allocated to the Inner Isles services between Kirkwall and Shapinsay.

References

1989 ships
Transport in Orkney
Ferries of Scotland
Ships built on the Humber